Dorcadion beckeri is a species of beetle in the family Cerambycidae. It was described by Kraatz in 1873.

Subspecies
 Dorcadion beckeri beckeri Kraatz, 1873
 Dorcadion beckeri koenigi Jakovlev, 1897

References

beckeri
Beetles described in 1873